XETEC-AM is a radio station on 1140 AM in Tecpatán, Chiapas. It is part of the state-owned Radio Chiapas state network and is known as Radio Tecpatán.

XETEC signed on March 25, 1999.

In November 2017, the IFT awarded a separate FM public concession to the Sistema Chiapaneco de Radio, Televisión y Cinematografía for XHTECP-FM 95.1, a class A FM station. This was never built, with the state government surrendering it on May 25, 2021, citing budget reallocation due to COVID-19.

References

Radio stations in Chiapas
Public radio in Mexico